Fernando Rubio (1943 – 27 June 2015) was a Mexican actor who appeared in more than 70 stage plays, 28 soap opera and 8 films. He died on 27 June 2015 at aged 72 from a heart attack and pneumonia.

At the time from his death, he couldn't pay the debts and the health care he need, and he wasn't supported by the Asociación Nacional de Actores where he was partner.

Filmography

Films

TV series

References

External links
 

1943 births
2015 deaths
Mexican male television actors
Mexican male film actors
Mexican male stage actors
20th-century Mexican male actors
21st-century Mexican male actors
Deaths from pneumonia in Mexico